The so-called Old English Lapidary (Cotton Tiberius A.iii)  is a 10th or 11th century Old English lapidary, a translation of older Latin glosses on the precious stones mentioned in the  Book of Revelation.

References
 Peter Kitson, 'Lapidary traditions in Anglo-Saxon England: part I, the background; the Old English Lapidary' in: Anglo-Saxon England, vol. 7, eds. Martin Biddle, Julian Brown, Peter Clemoes, Cambridge University Press, 2007, 9-60.
Joan Evans and Mary Sidney Serjeantsen (eds.), English Mediaeval Lapidaries, Early English Text Society Original Series 190, 1933 (reprinted 1999),  .
Robert Max Garrett, Precious stones in old English literature (1909)

Old English literature
Gemology
Cotton Library
11th-century manuscripts